Missing Pieces may refer to:

 Missing Pieces (TV series), an Australian factual television series
 Missing Pieces (Talk Talk album), 2001
 Missing Pieces (Autograph album), 1997
 Missing Pieces (Biffy Clyro album), 2009
 Missing Pieces (1992 film), a comedy film directed and written by Leonard Stern
 Missing Pieces (2000 film), an American made-for-television drama film
 Lost: Missing Pieces, a series of video clips from the television show Lost
 "Missing Pieces" (Agents of S.H.I.E.L.D.), an episode of Agents of S.H.I.E.L.D.